The Sikh 100 is an annual listicle of the 100 most influential Sikhs in the world assembled by a global Sikh organization "The Sikh Group". In 2020 the 9th edition was announced.

Multiple appearances 
Jathedars of Hazur Sahib, Akaal Takht Sahib, Budha Dal and Shaheedan Tarna Dal are consistently in the top five in the rankings. The President of Shiromani Gurdwara Parbandhak Committee (S.G.P.C) has also recently featured in the top 5.

Many Sikhs have been featured on list multiple times:

History

2020 
In 2020, a Sikh 100 Under 30 list was also released. Actor and singer Diljit Dosanjh made his debut in the 2020 list.

References 

Sikhs